Rear Admiral Charles Wilson Dyson (January 2, 1861 - October 25, 1930) was an American naval officer and engineer.

Biography
Dyson graduated from the United States Naval Academy in June 1883.  He was well known for his achievements in the field of engineering.  His designs covered machinery for naval vessels of all types, including Saratoga (CV-3) and Lexington (CV-2). He wrote extensively for technical magazines and revised Durand's treatise on Marine Engineering. For his meritorious service while in charge of the Division of Design of the Bureau of Steam Engineering during World War I, he was awarded the Navy Cross and the Distinguished Service Medal.

Dyson was retired December 2, 1925, and died in Washington, D.C., October 25, 1930.

Namesake
In 1942, the destroyer USS Dyson (DD-572) was named in his honor.

References

External links
 

1861 births
1930 deaths
Recipients of the Navy Cross (United States)
Recipients of the Navy Distinguished Service Medal
United States Naval Academy alumni
United States Navy admirals
United States Navy personnel of World War I
People from Cambridge, Maryland